Grachyovsky District is an administrative and municipal district (raion), one of the thirty-five in Orenburg Oblast, Russia. Its administrative center is the rural locality (a settlement) of Grachyovka. Population: 13,495 (2010 Census);  The population of Grachyovka accounts for 45.4% of the total district's population.

References

Notes

Sources

Districts of Orenburg Oblast